Aamer Jamal (born 5 July 1996) is a Pakistani cricketer.

Early career
Born in Mianwali but brought up in Rawalpindi, Jamal played most of his cricket in and around Islamabad, beginning his domestic career in 2013 with inter-region Under-19 and departmental Under-19 tournaments.

Domestic career
After performing for the Pakistan U19 team he played club cricket and league cricket in England. 

He made his first-class debut for Pakistan Television in the 2018–19 Quaid-e-Azam Trophy on 1 September 2018. He made his List A debut for Pakistan Television in the 2018–19 Quaid-e-Azam One Day Cup on 22 September 2018. 

In January 2021, he was named in Northern's squad for the 2020–21 Pakistan Cup.

International career
In September 2022, he was named in the Pakistan's T20I squad for the series against England. He made his T20I debut on 28 September 2022, against England.

References

External links
 

1996 births
Living people
Pakistani cricketers
Pakistan Twenty20 International cricketers
Pakistan Television cricketers
Place of birth missing (living people)